Babaing Hampaslupa is a 1988 Filipino romantic drama film directed by Mel Chionglo, written by Ricardo Lee, and starring Maricel Soriano as the titular vagabond Remy. It also stars Gina Alajar, Janice de Belen, Richard Gomez, Edu Manzano, Rowell Santiago, Liza Lorena, Leni Santos, and Carmina Villaroel. Produced by Regal Films, the film was released on November 16, 1988. Critic Lav Diaz gave the film a positive review, especially praising the first third for its intense melodrama and realism.

Cast
Maricel Soriano as Remedios
Gina Alajar as Desiree
Janice de Belen as Eden
Richard Gomez as Jimmy
Edu Manzano as Vincent
Rowell Santiago as Mario
Liza Lorena as Nita
Leni Santos as Edna
Carmina Villaroel as Fe
Anita Linda as Aling Ising
Mario Escudero as Ka Indo
Bing Davao as Crispin
Vangie Labalan as mother of Carling
Evelyn Vargas as Irma
Tita de Villa as Kasera
Aida Carmona as restaurant owner
Alma Lerma as Aling Leonor
Malu de Guzman as Nancy
Hazel Atuel as Marilyn
Elaine Eleazar as Melissa
Sylvia Garde as Bekang
Joe Jardi as Tana
Rosanna Jover as Cathy
Bon Vivar as Vincent's father
Lollie Mara as Vincent's mother
Lucy Quinto as Aling Naty
Josie Galvez as Cathy's mother
Eva Ramos as Miss Ramos
Maribel Legarda as Joy

Production
Eric Quizon was originally cast as Soriano's love interest, though he ultimately backed out of the project. Quizon would coincidentally later direct the similarly titled 2011 telenovela Babaeng Hampaslupa for TV5.

Release
Babaing Hampaslupa was released in the Philippines on November 16, 1988.

Critical response
Lav Diaz, writing for the Manila Standard, gave Babaing Hampaslupa a positive review, especially praising the first third of the film for its intense melodrama and realism, while expressing disappointment that the remaining two-thirds succumbed to commercialism. Diaz concluded that as a drama, the film is a great demonstration of good acting.

Accolades

Notes

References

External links

1988 films
1988 romantic drama films
Filipino-language films
Films about orphans
Philippine romantic drama films
Films directed by Mel Chionglo